Steven Harper Piziks is an American author of science fiction.

Piziks writes mostly science fiction, fantasy, steampunk, and film and television series novelizations. He has also written science fiction books with LGBT themes under his "Steven Harper" pseudonym and has been nominated for the Gaylactic Spectrum Award for his novels four times without winning, a record. He is also a member of the Book View Cafe writers co-op.

Biography
Piziks was born in Saginaw, Michigan, and grew up in the small town of Wheeler, Michigan. At twelve years of age, he moved to the outskirts of Midland, Michigan, then later to Saginaw, where he graduated from high school. He went to Central Michigan University, where he earned two bachelor's degrees: one in German/speech and one in English/health education, and to Seton Hill University, where he earned a master's degree in English. He currently writes science fiction and fantasy novels under two names and lives in Michigan with his husband, where he teaches English.

Awards
Dreamer (Roc, 2001) - Gaylactic Spectrum Award nominee 
Nightmare: A Novel of the Silent Empire (Roc, 2002) - Gaylactic Spectrum Award nominee 
Trickster'''' (Roc, 2003) - Gaylactic Spectrum Award nominee Offspring  - Gaylactic Spectrum Award nominee 

Bibliography

As Steven HarperUnity (a Battlestar Galactica novel) Dead Man on the Moon Dreamer: A Novel of the Silent Empire (Roc, 2001) Nightmare: A Novel of the Silent Empire (Roc, 2002) Trickster: A Novel of the Silent Empire (Roc, 2003) Offspring: A Novel of the Silent Empire (Roc, 2004) Writing the Paranormal Novel (Writers Digest Books, 2011) The Doomsday Vault: A Novel of the Clockwork Empire (Roc, 2011) The Impossible Cube: A Novel of the Clockwork Empire (Roc, 2012) The Dragon Men: A Novel of the Clockwork Empire (Roc, 2012) The Havoc Machine: A Novel of the Clockwork Empire (Roc, 2013) Iron Axe: A Novel of the Books of Blood and Iron (Roc, 2015) Blood Storm: A Novel of the Books of Blood and Iron (Roc, 2015) Bone War: A Novel of the Books of Blood and Iron (Roc, 2016) 

As Steven Piziks
 In the Company of Mind (Baen, 1996)
 Corporate Mentality (Baen, 1999)
 The Nanotech War (Pocket books, 2003) - A Star Trek novel.
 Identity (2003) - Novelisation
 The Exorcist: the Beginning (Pocket books) - Novelisation
 The Plague Room (Pocket books, 2003) - A Ghost Whisperer novel.

As Penny DrakeTrash Course'' (Carina Press, 2010)

See also
Gaylactic Spectrum Award winners and nominees for best novel

References

External links

Steven Piziks on LiveJournal
Official website

20th-century American novelists
21st-century American novelists
American male novelists
People from Saginaw, Michigan
Year of birth missing (living people)
American science fiction writers
Central Michigan University alumni
Living people
20th-century American male writers
21st-century American male writers